Fresh Kill is a 1994 British-American experimental film directed by Shu Lea Cheang and written by Jessica Hagedorn. It stars Sarita Choudhury and Erin McMurtry as Shareen Lightfoot and Claire Mayakovsky, two lesbian parents who are drawn into a corporate conspiracy involving the Fresh Kills Landfill. Fresh Kill was an official selection at the 1994 Berlin International Film Festival and the Toronto International Film Festival and is noted for its influence on hacker subculture, with an article about the film for the now-defunct hacker publication InfoNation containing one of the first uses of the term "hacktivism".

Synopsis
Shareen Lightfoot and Claire Mayakovsky raise their daughter Honey near the Fresh Kills Landfill on Staten Island in New York City. Shareen works as a salvager recovering refuse from the landfill, while Claire works as a waitress at a sushi restaurant. The city is heavily contaminated with pollution that adversely affects local animals and food; Claire brings home contaminated fish from the restaurant that is eaten by Honey, who begins glowing green and then vanishes. Shareen and Claire discover that the multinational GX Corporation is responsible for the pollution and Honey's disappearance, and become involved in an effort to hack and expose the company with sushi chef and hacker Jiannbin Lui, and poet and dishwasher Miguel Flores.

Cast
 Sarita Choudhury as Shareen Lightfoot 
 Erin McMurtry as Claire Mayakovsky
 Abraham Lim as Jiannbin Lui 
 José Zúñiga as Miguel Flores
 Laurie Carlos as Mimi Mayakovsky
 Will Kempe as Stuart Sterling
 Nelini Stamp as Honey
 Rino Thunder as Clayton Lightfoot

Production
Fresh Kill was directed by Shu Lea Cheang and written by Jessica Hagedorn. The film bills itself as "eco cyber noia", the term "cyber noia" (or "cybernoia") having been coined by Cheang to describe "massive intrusions of networking technology into people's lives," and what she foresaw as "a future where multinational media empires clash with hackers." Cheang has stated that the film was motivated by a desire to depict the relationship between the media and environmental racism, drawing parallels between the dumping of industrial toxic waste in the Third World with "the dumping of garbage TV programs" into Third World countries. Hagedorn has stated that she wished to invert typical expectations and cliché stock characters, though sought not to "reverse things for their own sake," noting that Honey's parentage and the differing races of characters with direct biological relations are specifically never explained.

Release
The film premiered on April 23, 1994 at the USA Film Festival, and was an official selection at the 1994 Berlin International Film Festival and at the Toronto International Film Festival. It was released theatrically in the United States on January 12, 1996. Fresh Kill also screened at the Whitney Biennial in 1995, and at the Asian American International Film Festival in 2019.

Critical response and legacy

In a review for The Los Angeles Times, critic Kevin Thomas offered praise for Cheang's direction and Hagedorn's writing, noting that the film's "interaction of a deteriorating environment, burgeoning cyberspace and mounting urban paranoia [...] create a vividly contemporary background" for a "gentle lesbian love story." The Quad Cinema, where the film had its U.S. premiere, called Fresh Kill "an underseen radical feminist gem" and favorably compared it to Brazil and Born in Flames. Conversely, Janet Maslin of The New York Times offered praise for the film's soundtrack but described Fresh Kill as "aimless, arty self-indulgence carried to a remarkable extreme," while Nathan Rabin of The A.V. Club surmised that the film was "too confused and disjointed to be anything but a well-intentioned, intermittently interesting failure."

The film is noted for its themes of solidarity by marginalized groups against racism and sexism; its condemnation of transnational capitalism; and its depiction of how "resistance circulates through networks originally designed to facilitate the exchange of labor, commodities, and capital." In her analysis of Fresh Kill, Gina Marchetti notes how the film depicts "the emancipatory potential of the digital," offering "hope for seizing the means of communication by reflecting on its own production and providing an image of radical media empowerment to inspire others." The film is noted for its influence on hacker subculture, with a 1995 article about the film for the now-defunct hacker publication InfoNation containing one of the first uses of the term "hacktivism".

References

External links
 

1994 films
1994 drama films
1994 independent films
1994 LGBT-related films
American science fiction drama films
1990s science fiction drama films
American independent films
American LGBT-related films
Lesbian-related films
Works about computer hacking
British films set in New York City
Film4 Productions films
American avant-garde and experimental films
American feminist films
Hacker culture
1990s English-language films
1990s American films
British feminist films
British independent films
British avant-garde and experimental films
British LGBT-related films
British science fiction drama films
1990s British films